Cichocki (feminine: Cichocka; plural: Cichoccy) is a Polish surname, it may refer to:
 Angelika Cichocka (born 1988), Polish athlete
 Bartosz Cichocki (born 1976), Polish political scientist, historian, diplomat
 Chris Cichocki (born 1963), American ice hockey player
 Jacek Cichocki (born 1971), Polish politician
 Jan August Cichocki (1750–1795), Polish general
 Lena Dąbkowska-Cichocka (born 1973), Polish politician
 Marek Cichocki, a Polish philosopher, historian of political thought.
 Mateusz Cichocki (born 1992), Polish footballer

See also
 

Polish-language surnames